Leptomyrmex rothneyi is a species of ant in the genus Leptomyrmex. Described by Auguste-Henri Forel in 1902, the species is endemic to Australia.

References

Dolichoderinae
Hymenoptera of Australia
Insects described in 1902